Dick Carruthers (born 25 March 1966, Sussex, England) is an English music video and film director, based in London, England. He directed the Led Zeppelin Celebration Day film and The Rolling Stones Bridges To Babylon DVD (as live concert director) as well as many other live music videos. Carruthers' work on the Oasis Definitely Maybe DVD was nominated for two BAFTAs.

Education 
Carruthers attended Winchester University (then known as King Alfred's College) where he completed a BA (Hons) degree in Drama Theatre and Television Studies.

Career 
Before success in the music and film industries, Carruthers worked in corporate videos and in the conference and events industries. He began his directing career in the music business touring with English pop group Take That in 1993. He also toured with Jamiroquai, Texas, and Oasis. In 1996 he directed the visuals and filmed the Oasis Knebworth shows and in 1997 he was invited aboard the Rolling Stones’ Bridges To Babylon World Tour. In 2002 he joined forces with Anouk Fontaine at Metropolis Studios in London England working as M: Productions. Cheese Film Video Ltd. was incorporated in 2005.

Work with Led Zeppelin 

Carruthers was introduced to Jimmy Page following the acclaim of The Who Live at the Royal Albert Hall (2000). Page wanted to sort through unseen footage of Led Zeppelin in its prime and spent a year and a half with Carruthers making the retrospective double-disc Led Zeppelin DVD with vintage footage from concerts filmed in London, Paris, New York and elsewhere. The release won numerous awards, was nominated for a BAFTA and remains one of the best selling music DVDs of all time. Carruthers continued his association with Led Zeppelin as the creative director on the Warner Home video Special Edition release of The Song Remains the Same (recorded during three nights of concerts at New York’s Madison Square Garden, on the band’s 1973 concert tour of the US), adding feature extras, cuts of new songs, and surround sound.

When the band agreed to the O2 reunion (2007), a benefit for the Ahmet Ertegün Education Fund, Carruthers was hired to direct the filming. The resulting film Celebration Day was released to worldwide acclaim on 17 October 2012 (UK).

Work with Oasis 

Carruthers first worked with the British rock band Oasis on their Earls Court shows in 1995, and the Maine Road shows in 1996, later released as ...There and Then (1996). In 2000 as director on the documentary Familiar to Millions (recorded at Wembley Stadium on 21 July 2000), as well as Standing On The Edge Of The Noise (Channel 4), Live At Union Chapel (Channel 4), and Glasgow Barowlands (Sky TV). To mark the tenth anniversary of its original release Carruthers also directed Definitely Maybe released on DVD in September 2004.

Carruthers later worked with the band's guitarist, songwriter Noel Gallagher on his Noel Gallagher's High Flying Birds debut album documentary DVD.

Documentaries and live concerts 

Other documentaries and live concerts include Sarah Brightman - Dreamchaser in Concert (2013), Don't Believe the Truth - Live In Manchester (2005), 10 Years Of Noise and Confusion (shot at Glasgow Barrowlands), the rockumentary film Lord Don't Slow Me Down (2007), Standing on the Edge of the Noise (2008), a Josh Groban (2015) PBS TV special, and an Imagine Dragons (2016) live DVD filmed at The Air Canada Centre, Toronto, Ontario, Canada.

Work with Julian Lennon 

In 2012 Carruthers worked with Julian Lennon on the feature length video documentary Through The Picture Window which followed Lennon's journey in the making of his album Everything Changes and includes interviews with Steven Tyler, Bono and Paul Buchanan from The Blue Nile. Through The Picture Window was also released as an app in all formats with bespoke videos for all 14 tracks from the album.

Work with The Script 

In 2011 Carruthers directed The Script's DVD Homecoming: Live at the Aviva Stadium, Dublin, which was part of the Irish group's Science & Faith Tour and was their biggest headline show to date (50,000 people).

Work with Aerosmith 

In 2014 the Aerosmith Rocks Donington DVD was released directed by Carruthers. The film captures the group headlining the massive Download Festival at Donington Park as they deliver a set of their greatest hits.

Awards 

 The Who Live at the Royal Albert Hall was nominated for Best DVD at the 2000 NME Awards.
 Led Zeppelin DVD (2003) BAFTA nomination, New York Awards, Best DVD (2003 CADS)
 White Stripes: Under Blackpool Lights was nominated for Best DVD (2004 CADS).
 Oasis' Definitely Maybe DVD (2004) was nominated for two BAFTAs.
 Take That - Best DVD 2006 (CADS)
 Celebration Day won best music DVD at the Classic Rock Awards, and Best Live Coverage (for Dick Carruthers) at the UKMVA 2013.

Selected music video credits (as director)

References

External links 
 Cinefromage - Dick Carruthers' official site
 
 "What Makes A Great Concert Film", BBC 6Music
 High Point/Low Point: Dick Carruthers  - [PIAS]' blog, 27 April 2015

British music video directors
1966 births
Living people